Robert Keith Pringle (12 March 1802 – 12 January 1897) was a Scottish civil servant in the Bombay Presidency.

He was one of 11 children — five sons and six daughters — born to Alexander Pringle of Whytbank and Mary, daughter of Sir Alexander Dick, 3rd Baronet of Prestonfield.

Sind
He was appointed the first Chief Commissioner of Sind in 1847.

References

British East India Company civil servants
1802 births
1897 deaths